David Xavier Cifu (born July 17, 1962, New York City, New York) is an American physiatrist, researcher, and medical educator.  He is the Associate Dean for Innovation and System Integration in the School of Medicine at Virginia Commonwealth University School of Medicine, the chairman and Herman J. Flax M.D. Professor of the Department of Physical Medicine and Rehabilitation (PM&R) at Virginia Commonwealth University (VCU) in Richmond, Virginia, staff physiatrist at the Hunter Holmes McGuire Veterans Administration Medical Center (HHM-VAMC), founding director of the VCU-Center for Rehabilitation Science and Engineering and senior TBI specialist in the Department of Veterans Affairs' Veterans Health Administration.

Early life and education
Cifu graduated from Boston University with an M. D. in 1986. He began post-graduate training at the Baylor College of Medicine in July 1986. He began his internship in Transitional Medicine in July 1986 and residency in Physical Medicine and Rehabilitation from 1986-1990. He joined the faculty of the BCM (Departments of PM&R and Restorative Neurology) as a staff physiatrist at the Houston VAMC in July 1990.

Career
In 2005, Cifu was instrumental in developing the VCU Center for Rehabilitation Science and Engineering, a research consortium. He was CERSE's Executive Director from 2005-2013. He has also been a volunteer member of the American Academy of Physical Medicine and Rehabilitation since 1988 AAPM&R, and a member of its board of governors from 2000–2009 and president from 2007-8. He joined the Veterans Health Administration as Chief of PM&R services at the Hunter Holmes McGuire VAMC in 2006, became Deputy Director of the PM&R Program Office of the Department of Veterans Affairs in 2009, was National Director of the PM&R Program Office of the Department of Veterans Affairs from 2010–14 and is Senior TBI Specialist for the Department of Veterans Affairs. In 2014, he received the Commonwealth of Virginia's Outstanding Faculty Award from the State Council of Higher Education of Virginia SCHEV.

Cifu has published five books, co-authored more than 25 book chapters and published more than 220 scientific journal articles. In 2009 and again in 2016, he co-led the development and publication of the joint Departments of Veterans Affairs and Defense Clinical Practice Guidelines for The Management of Concussion/Mild TBI. In 2010, he authored Traumatic Brain Injury, a guide for specialists, as part of the Demos Rehabilitation Medicine Quick Reference Series. In 2011, he co-authored, with Cory Blake, the patient self-help book Overcoming Post-Deployment Syndrome: A Six Step Mission to Health to help returning service members and Veterans from the Afghanistan and Iraq wars. In 2013, he released Handbook of Polytrauma Care and Rehabilitation Handbook of Polytrauma Care and Rehabilitation as a portable guide for everyday clinicians and health care providers. In 2015, he served as the editor-in-chief of the 5th edition of the Braddom's Physical Medicine and Rehabilitation, and in 2017 he served as co-editor in chief of the Braddom's Handbook of Rehabilitation Medicine.

References

American medical researchers
Physicians from Virginia
Living people
1962 births
Boston University School of Medicine alumni